Matthew G. Trollinger is a United States Marine Corps major general who serves as the commander of United States Marine Forces Special Operations Command since May 23, 2022. He most recently served as the Deputy Director for Politico-Military Affairs (Middle East) of the Joint Staff. He was previously the Commanding General of the 5th Marine Expeditionary Brigade from July 2018 to July 6, 2020.

Career
Trollinger graduated from the Old Dominion University and received his commission into the Marine Corps in 1990 as an infantry officer. Trollinger has a diverse background in reconnaissance, security forces, and special operations, deploying numerous times in support of both routine and emergent requirements. Trollinger has held commands to include the Naval Amphibious Force, Task Force 51/5th Marine Expeditionary Brigade, 11th Marine Expeditionary Unit, 3rd Marine Special Operations Battalion, and 1st Fleet Antiterrorism Security Team Company. Trollinger also served as the Operations Officer for a Marine Expeditionary Unit as well as a Battalion Landing Team. In 1998, Trollinger graduated from the Amphibious Warfare School, and in 2011 he was the Commandant of the Marine Corps Fellow with the Center for Strategic and International Studies. 

In June 2012, he was assigned as the Military Assistant to the Deputy Undersecretary of the Navy for Plans, Policy, Oversight and Integration.

In April 2016, Trollinger completed the AMP at Harvard Business School.

On May 23, 2022,  Trollinger took command of the United States Marine Forces Special Operations Command (MARSOC) after outgoing commander Major General James F. Glynn relinquished his duties during a change of command ceremony at Camp Lejeune, North Carolina.

Personal life
Trollinger is married, and he and his wife, Nancy have two children.

Awards and decorations

References

External links

Year of birth missing (living people)
Living people
Place of birth missing (living people)
United States Marine Corps generals